Trepcza  (Terepcha) is a village in the administrative district of Gmina Sanok, within Sanok County, Subcarpathian Voivodeship, in south-eastern Poland.

"Hic erat olim Manasterium O.S.B.M (Ordo Sancti Basilii Magni) in Monte alto, sed pridem abolitum, cujus rudera solummodo manserunt.  

The village has a population of 800.

See also
 Walddeutsche

References

Villages in Sanok County